Kopitiam Investment Pte Ltd, more commonly known as Kopitiam, is a Singaporean food court chain focused on local cuisine. Founded in 1988, it operates around 80 outlets at many locations across Singapore, including Changi Airport, Plaza Singapura, VivoCity and Jem. Kopitiam also owns three subsidary food court companies, Bagus, Cantine, and Sedap.

Etymology
The name derives from the generic portmanteau term "kopi tiam" for "coffee house" in Singaporean Malay and Singaporean Hokkien.

History
On 21 September 2018, it was announced that NTUC Enterprise would acquire Kopitiam by the end of 2018. The acquisition was approved by the Competition and Consumer Commission of Singapore on 20 December 2018.

See also

Other Singaporean food court chains
Food Republic 
Koufu

References

1988 establishments in Singapore
Singaporean brands
Food court in Singapore